Jacob Isaiah Pace (born September 6, 1998) is an Internet entrepreneur. He is the Chief Strategy Officer of Pearpop, a creator marketplace. He is also the founder of Flighthouse, a short-form digital content studio which was acquired by Create Music Group in 2016.

Career 
Pace was born in El Paso, Texas.  He started his first company, a YouTube channel, when he was 14 years old to promote music that he was producing. In 2015, Pace was recruited by Create Music Group after he graduated high school to run business development in Los Angeles, California. He moved to Los Angeles, California, at 16 years of age.

In 2016, Pace identified digital media brand Flighthouse and led the acquisition at Create Music Group.

In 2021, Pace was hired by Pearpop, a creator marketplace co-founded by Guy Oseary to be their Chief Strategy Officer.

Awards and honors
Business
 Forbes 30 Under 30
 Rolling Stone Future 25

References 

Living people
1998 births
American media executives